Enyalioides binzayedi is a species of lizards in the genus Enyalioides known from only one location in the Cordillera Azul National Park in Peru. The lizard is named after Mohammed bin Zayed Al Nahyan, who sponsored the field survey that led to the discovery of the species.

References

External links
 

Reptiles described in 2013
Reptiles of Peru
Endemic fauna of Peru
Lizards of South America
Enyalioides
Taxa named by Pablo J. Venegas
Taxa named by Omar Torres-Carvajal
Taxa named by Vilma Duran
Taxa named by Kevin de Queiroz